The Tamsui River (alternatively Danshui River) is third longest river in Taiwan after Zhuoshui River and Gaoping River, with a total length of , flowing through Hsinchu County, Taoyuan, Taipei and New Taipei City. It is located in northern part of the island.

Geography

The Tamsui River begins at the confluence of Xindian River and Dahan River at the western boundary of Taipei and New Taipei City, just north of Banqiao District, and flows northward and northwestward, passing the eponymous Tamsui District, then emptying into the Taiwan Strait. Formerly known as the "Dolatok River", it is one of the few rivers in the island that flows along a north–south direction.

The river's three tributaries are the Xindian River, Dahan River and Keelung River. The Dahan River is the main tributary and has its headwaters in the Pintian Mountain in Hsinchu County and flows through Hsinchu County, Taoyuan City and New Taipei City.

A major artificial distributary on the left bank of the Tamsui, the Erchong Floodway, was completed in 1984 as part of a flood control scheme for the Taipei Basin. The flood control plan for Greater Taipei dated back to 1959, and by 1987, dykes had been built along the banks of the Tamsui.

Pollution 

The Tamsui River is heavily polluted by both raw sewage and industrial pollution from illegal industry. Clean up and natural river restoration is on the agenda of the Taipei City Government, Executive Yuan and several citizen organizations. Through the 1970s, the river was clean and could support ship traffic and fishing. By the 1980s, the Tamsui was polluted and was dominated by tilapia. Governmental efforts to clean up the Tamsui include "The Recovery Project of the Tamsui River Watershed Area implemented in 1987 by the Environmental Protection Administration, at the time a division of the Department of Health. This effort was finally undertaken as a result of massive public pressure. The first goal set was the have the river no longer smell in the summer. Water quality improved significantly however efforts to improve water quality were hampered by the numerous residences whose sewage emptied straight into the river. Cleanup efforts continue to the present day, and include linking the watershed's residents to a shared sewer system.

Popular culture 
Due to its pollution the phrase “I’d rather jump into the Tamsui River!” was once a popular saying in Taipei.

Bridges
Several famous bridges run across the river, from south to north downstream:
 
 
 Taipei Bridge
 Danshui River Bridge
 
 Guandu Bridge
 Danjiang Bridge (under construction)
 Tamsui Lover's Bridge (incomplete crossing within Tamsui only)

See also 
List of rivers in Taiwan

References

Rivers of Taiwan
Landforms of New Taipei
Landforms of Taipei